Hugh Brophy (born 2 September 1948 in Dublin) is an Irish retired footballer who played during the 1960s and 1970s.

Brophy was a midfielder who played for Shamrock Rovers and Bohemians amongst others during his career in the League of Ireland. Brophy played alongside the likes of Tommy Kelly and Turlough O'Connor during his time at Bohs.

He made his Rovers debut on 20 March 1966 against Drumcondra at Milltown. He signed for Crystal Palace in July 1966, but after only one league appearance as a substitute for Johnny Byrne in the last game of the 1966–67 season, left the club in 1967. He re-signed for Shamrock Rovers in November 1968, winning the FAI Cup in 1969.

He played for the Republic of Ireland national football team amateur team in the qualifiers for the 1967 UEFA Amateur Cup.

Honours
 FAI Cup
 Shamrock Rovers 1969
  Top Four Cup
 Shamrock Rovers 1966
Leinster Senior Cup
 Shamrock Rovers - 1968/69

References

Further reading
 The Hoops by Paul Doolan and Robert Goggins

External links
Brophy at holmesdale.net

Republic of Ireland association footballers
Shamrock Rovers F.C. players
League of Ireland players
Bohemian F.C. players
Crystal Palace F.C. players
English Football League players
1948 births
Living people
Association football midfielders